Özoğuz is a Turkish surname. Notable people with the surname include:

 Aydan Özoğuz (born 1967), German politician of Turkish descent
 Gökhan Özoğuz (born 1976), Turkish musician
 Hakan Özoğuz (born 1976), Turkish musician

Turkish-language surnames